Rathsoony is a ringfort and National Monument located in County Galway, Ireland.

Location
Rathsoony is located 4 km (2½ miles) southeast of Loughrea.

History and description
Rathsoony is a quadrivallate rath not much raised above the field level, with a central rampart and two fosses with an intervening ring and marked by a sunken way. It also has a souterrain. The Irish name means "Ringfort of the palisade", indicating that it was surrounded by a wall of stakes.

References

National Monuments in County Galway
Archaeological sites in County Galway